Roy James Tarpley (November 28, 1964 – January 9, 2015) was an American professional basketball player. He played the power forward and center positions in the National Basketball Association (NBA), earning an NBA Sixth Man of the Year Award in 1988. In 1995, Tarpley was permanently banned by the NBA due to his drug and alcohol abuse. He played in Europe for Olympiacos, Aris, and Iraklis.

College career
Tarpley starred at the University of Michigan, and was named a 3rd-Team All-American by the AP in 1985 and 1986. In the 1984–85 season Tarpley led the Wolverines to the Big Ten championship, averaging 19.0 points and 10.4 rebounds per game throughout the season, himself earning the Big Ten Player of the Year award. On February 7, 1985, he posted a career-high in scoring against Purdue with 31 points. In his senior season Tarpley set the school record for most blocked shots in a game against Florida Southern. He led his school in blocked shots in each of his college years, and he also led the school in scoring and rebounding in all but his freshman season. As of March 2014, he was the Wolverines' all-time leader in blocked shots with 251. Tarpley finished his college career posting averages of 13.1 points, 7.8 rebounds and 2.1 blocks per game.

Professional career

Dallas Mavericks (1986–1991) 
In 1986, Tarpley was selected by the Dallas Mavericks, in the first round, with the seventh pick of the NBA draft. Tarpley made the NBA All-Rookie Team in his first season. The following year, he won the NBA Sixth Man of the Year Award, when he averaged 13.5 points and 11.8 rebounds per game. During the 1988 NBA Playoffs, Tarpley and the Mavericks nearly made it to the NBA Finals, losing in the Western Conference Finals to the Los Angeles Lakers. In the seven-game series, Tarpley averaged 15.9 points, 13 rebounds, and 2.1 blocks. The following season, on November 9, 1988, Tarpley scored a career high 35 points and grabbed 17 rebounds in a 111–103 loss to the Phoenix Suns.

Six games into the 1989–90 season, he was arrested for driving while intoxicated and resisting arrest, and suspended by the NBA. In March 1991, he drew another suspension, after being arrested for DWI again. A few months later, after a third violation, he was banned from the league for violating the NBA's drug-use policies.

Return to Dallas (1994–1995) 
Tarpley returned to the Mavericks briefly in 1994, but was then permanently banned from the NBA in December 1995, for using alcohol and violating the terms of a court-imposed personal aftercare program. He finished with NBA career with averages of 12.6 points and 10.0 rebounds per game.

Tarpley sued the Dallas Mavericks and the NBA, claiming that their refusal to reinstate him violated the Americans with Disabilities Act because his addiction was a disability. The suit was settled out of court in January 2009.

Europe 
Tarpley also played for Aris, Olympiacos, Iraklis, and Esperos Kallitheas in Greece's top-tier level professional basketball league, the Greek Basket League. In the 1992–93 FIBA European Cup season, he won the European-wide second-tier level FIBA European Cup, with Sato Aris, against the Turkish Super League club Efes Pilsen. The tournament's final took place in Turin.

Tarpley reached the European-wide top-tier level EuroLeague's Final, the following year, by playing in the 1994 EuroLeague Final Four. During the final four, he played with Olympiacos, against 7up Joventut, in Tel Aviv. That same year, he led the EuroLeague competition in rebounds, with an average of 12.8 per game. With Olympiacos, Tarpley also won the Greek League and the Greek Cup.

Michigan Mayhem (2005–2006) 
Tarpley played with the Michigan Mayhem of the Continental Basketball Association (CBA) during part of the 2005–2006 season before suffering a season-ending hand injury. He was selected to the CBA All-Star Game, but missed the game because of his injury.

Death
Tarpley died on January 9, 2015, aged 50. No official cause of death was released, but reports indicated that it was due to liver failure.

References

External links
NBA.com historical playerfile
College & NBA stats @ basketballreference.com
FIBA Europe Profile
Greek Basket League Profile 

1964 births
2015 deaths
20th-century African-American sportspeople
21st-century African-American people
African-American basketball players
All-American college men's basketball players
American expatriate basketball people in China
American expatriate basketball people in Cyprus
American expatriate basketball people in Greece
American expatriate basketball people in Russia
American men's basketball players
American sportspeople in doping cases
Aris B.C. players
Basketball players from Detroit
Basketball players from New York City
Beijing Olympians players
CBA All-Star Game players
Centers (basketball)
Cooley High School alumni
Dallas Mavericks draft picks
Dallas Mavericks players
Doping cases in basketball
Esperos B.C. players
Iraklis Thessaloniki B.C. players
Michigan Mayhem players
Michigan Wolverines men's basketball players
National Basketball Association players banned for drug offenses
Olympiacos B.C. players
PBC Ural Great players
Power forwards (basketball)
Sioux Falls Skyforce (CBA) players
United States Basketball League players
Wichita Falls Texans players